This is a list of Classical Turkish Music composers in alphabetical order:

A 
Abdurrahman Bahir Efendi (Arabzade) - 1746
Abdülkadir Meragi - 1435
Ahmet Uzel
Ahmet Yektâ Madran - 1865
Ali Şir Nevai - 1501
Aziz Mahmud Hudayi - 1628

B 
Bekir Büyükarkın
Bestâmi Yazgan
Beşir Ayvazoğlu
Bîmen Şen
Bolâhenk Nuri Bey
Buhûrizâde Abdülkerim Efendi

C 
Cinuçen Tanrıkorur - 2001

H 
Hafız Post - 1693
Hacı Arif Bey
Hampartsoum Limondjian
Hüseyin Baykara - 1506

I 
Buhurizade Mustafa Itri - 1712
İsmail Dede Efendi - (1778 - 1846)

K 
Kâni Karaca - 2004
Kantemiroğlu - 1727

L 
Leyla Saz - 1936

M 
Mesut Cemil - 1945
Muzaffer Ozak - 1984
Münir Nurettin Selçuk - 1981

N 
Necdet Yaşar - alive

R 
Rauf Yekta Bey - 1935

S 
Sadettin Kaynak
Selim III
Şerif Muhiddin Targan - 1967

T 
Tamburi Cemil Bey - 1916
Tatyos Efendi - 1913

Turkish
Turkish classical composers
Composers